The  1998 Miami Dolphins season was the team's 33rd overall and 29th as a member of the National Football League (NFL). The Dolphins improved upon their previous season's output of 9–7, winning ten games. The team qualified for the playoffs for the second straight year. The Dolphins defeated the Buffalo Bills 24–17 in the Wild Card round, but lost to the defending and eventual Super Bowl champion Denver Broncos 38–3 in the Divisional Playoff Game.

The 2012 Football Outsiders Almanac states that the 1998 Dolphins had the single biggest defensive improvement (from the previous season) from 1991 to 2011.

As with the 1985 Bears, the Dolphins defeated a team (the Broncos) widely tipped a few weeks earlier to beat their unbeaten 1972 season, although this time the Dolphins were not defending their status as the only unbeaten team since the Giants had already beaten the Broncos. Because, before the admission of the Texans in 2002, scheduling for NFL games outside a team's division was subject to much greater influence from table position during the previous season, that game was the first time the Dolphins had opposed the Broncos since that same 1985 season.

This season marked the last time the Dolphins finished with the #1 Defense in the NFL.

Offseason

NFL Draft

Roster

Schedule 

Note: Intra-division opponents are in bold text.

Playoffs

Standings

References 

Miami Dolphins seasons
Miami Dolphins
Miami Dolphins